A Message to Gracias is a 1964 Warner Bros. Looney Tunes cartoon directed by Robert McKimson and Ted Bonnicksen. The short was released on February 8, 1964, and stars Speedy Gonzales and Sylvester. The title and plot are a reference to the essay A Message to Garcia.

Plot
The plot of this cartoon involves Mexican Revolutionary mice led by El Supremo, who wants to have an important message brought to General Gracias on the other side of the country. Numerous attempts to deliver the message fail when every messenger is caught and eaten by Sylvester. Desperate, El Supremo's subordinates suggest to summon Speedy to deliver the message.

After overcoming several of Sylvester's attempts to thwart him, Speedy traps Sylvester and delivers the important message to the general—only for it to turn out to be a "Happy Birthday" from El Supremo, who then appears to congratulate Gracias in person. Disgusted because he has gone through all the trouble for such a trivial task, Speedy returns to Sylvester, who is of the same mind. Speedy unties Sylvester, who then chases after the two generals.

Crew
Co-Director: Ted Bonnicksen
Story: John Dunn
Animation: George Grandpré, Ted Bonnicksen, Warren Batchelder, Keith Darling, Morey Reden
Layouts and Backgrounds: Robert Gribbroek
Effects Animation: Harry Love
Film Editor: Treg Brown
Voice Characterization: Mel Blanc, Roger Green
Music: Bill Lava
Produced by: David H. DePatie and Friz Freleng
Directed by: Robert McKimson

Home media
DVD - Looney Tunes Golden Collection: Volume 4, Disc 3

References

External links

1964 films
1964 animated films
1964 short films
Speedy Gonzales films
Sylvester the Cat films
Looney Tunes shorts
Warner Bros. Cartoons animated short films
Films directed by Robert McKimson
Animated films about mice
Animated films about cats
Films set in Mexico
Mexican Revolution films
Films scored by William Lava
1960s Warner Bros. animated short films
1960s English-language films